William Longsword (c. 893 – 17 December 942) was the second ruler of Normandy, from 927 until his assassination in 942.

He is sometimes anachronistically dubbed "duke of Normandy", even though the title duke (dux) did not come into common usage until the 11th century. Longsword was known at the time as count (Latin comes) of Rouen. 
Flodoard—always detailed about titles—consistently referred to both Rollo and his son William as principes (chieftains) of the Normans.

Birth
William Longsword was born "overseas" to the Viking Rollo (while he was still a pagan) and his wife more danico Poppa of Bayeux. Dudo of Saint-Quentin in his panegyric of the Norman dukes describes Poppa as the daughter of a Count Berengar, the dominant prince of that region. In the 11th-century Annales Rotomagenses (Annals of Rouen), she is called the daughter of Guy, Count of Senlis, otherwise unknown to history.<ref group=lower-alpha>See Commentary: The origin of Poppa at: [http://sbaldw.home.mindspring.com/hproject/prov/poppa000.htm Stewart Baldwin, The Henry Project: "Poppa"] for more detailed discussion and opinions.</ref> Her parentage is uncertain. According to the Longsword's planctus, he was baptized a Christian probably at the same time as his father, which Orderic Vitalis stated was in 912, by Franco, Archbishop of Rouen.

Life
William succeeded Rollo (who would continue to live for about another 5 years) in 927 and, early in his reign, faced a rebellion from Normans who felt he had become too Gallicised. According to Orderic Vitalis, the leader was Riouf of Evreux,Crouch, p. 11 who besieged William in Rouen. Sallying forth, William won a decisive battle, proving his authority to be duke. At the time of this 933 rebellion, William sent his pregnant wife more danico, Sprota, to Fécamp where their son Richard was born.

In 933, William recognized Raoul as King of Western Francia, who was struggling to assert his authority in Northern France. In turn, Raoul gave him lordship over much of the lands of the Bretons including Avranches, the Cotentin Peninsula and the Channel Islands.The Annals of Flodoard of Reims; 916–966, eds. & trans. Steven Fanning and Bernard S. Bachrach (New York; Ontario Canada: University of Toronto Press, 2011), p. xvii & notes 15b, 85 The Bretons did not agree to these changes and resistance to the Normans was led by Alan II, Duke of Brittany, and Count Berengar of Rennes but ended shortly with great slaughter and Breton castles being razed to the ground, Alan fled to England and Berengar sought reconciliation.

In 935, William married Luitgarde, daughter of Count Herbert II of Vermandois whose dowry gave him the lands of Longueville, Coudres and Illiers-l'Évêque. He also contracted a marriage between his sister Adela (Gerloc was her Norse name) and William, Count of Poitou, with the approval of Hugh the Great. In addition to supporting King Raoul, he was now a loyal ally of his father-in-law, Herbert II, both of whom his father Rollo had opposed. In January 936, King Raoul died and the 16-year-old Louis IV, who was living in exile in England, was persuaded by a promise of loyalty by William, to return and became king. The Bretons returned to recover the lands taken by the Normans, resulting in fighting in the expanded Norman lands.

The new king was not capable of controlling his Barons and after William's brother-in-law, Herluin II, Count of Montreuil, was attacked by Flanders, William went to their assistance in 939, Arnulf I, Count of Flanders retaliated by attacking Normandy. Arnulf captured the castle of Montreuil-sur-Mer expelling Herluin. Herluin and William cooperated to retake the castle.David Nicholas, Medieval Flanders (London: Longman Group UK Limited, 1992), p. 40 William was excommunicated for his actions in attacking and destroying several estates belonging to Arnulf.  William pledged his loyalty to King Louis IV when they met in 940 and, in return, he was confirmed in lands that had been given to his father, Rollo.

In 941, a peace treaty was signed between the Bretons and Normans, brokered in Rouen by King Louis IV which limited the Norman expansion into Breton lands. The following year, on 17 December 942 at Picquigny on an island on the Somme, William was ambushed and killed by followers of Arnulf while at a peace conference to settle their differences.

Family
William had no children with his Christian wife Luitgarde. He fathered his son, Richard, with Sprota. his wife more danico''. Richard, then aged 10, succeeded as Ruler of Normandy upon William's death in December 942.

Notes

References

External links
Planctus for William
Stewart Baldwin on Guillaume "Longue Épée" of Normandy

890s births
942 deaths
Burials at Rouen Cathedral
Year of birth uncertain
10th-century Dukes of Normandy
Dukes of Normandy
House of Normandy
10th-century Normans
10th-century rulers in Europe
Converts to Christianity from pagan religions
Norman warriors